The national flower of the Republic of China was officially designated as the plum blossom by the Executive Yuan of the Republic of China on 21 July 1964. The plum blossom, known as the meihua, is a symbol for resilience and perseverance in the face of adversity, because plum blossoms often bloom most vibrantly even amidst the harsh winter snow. As the plum tree can usually grow for a long time, ancient trees are found throughout China. Huangmei county (Yellow Mei) in Hubei features a 1,600-year-old plum tree from the Jin Dynasty which is still flowering. The three stamens represents Dr. Sun Yat-sen's Three Principles of the People, while the five petals symbolize the five branches of the government: Executive Yuan, Legislative Yuan, Judicial Yuan, Examination Yuan and Control Yuan. The flower has also been proposed to be one of the national flowers for the People's Republic of China.

History
The mudan (Paeonia suffruticosa) was referred to as the "national flower" of China during the Ming and Qing era. It was still recognised by many to be the national flower during the Beiyang government era, amidst calls to designate other flowers such as the Chrysanthemum to be the national symbol.

The Ceremony and Uniform Review Committee of the Ministry of the Interior (MOI), Nationalist Government in 1928 proposed that the plum blossom be the National Flower; the Ministry of Education (MOE) reviewed the proposal and assented to it. The Ministry of Finance (MOF) had also requested the Central Executive Committee (CEC) of the Kuomintang (Nationalist Party) to designate the National Flower for the making of new currency. On 28 January 1929, the CEC adopted a resolution to use the plum blossom for various emblems of the state, but regarding the designation of the National Flower, they decided to list it as one of the agendas of the party's 3rd National Congress. The Nationalist Government issued a general order on 8 February 1929, adopting the plum blossom in various state emblem designs. Despite the designation not being approved during the 3rd National Congress, the plum blossom has been widely accepted by society as the symbol of the nation.

In 1964, the MOI advised the Executive Yuan to stipulate it as the National Flower; the latter, in a reply on 21 July 1964, stated that the plum blossom as the national flower "has long been recognised nationwide", and that there was "no need to make an announcement or a press release". The plum blossom was thus recognised by the Executive Yuan as the National Flower of the Republic of China (the country's effective jurisdiction was reduced to Taiwan after the Chinese Civil War) as an established fact.

Symbolism
As the National Flower, the plum blossom symbolises:
Three buds and five petals - symbolises Three Principles of the People and the five branches of the Government in accordance with the Constitution
The plum blossom withstands the cold winter (it blossoms more in colder temperatures) - it symbolises the faithful, the resolute and the holy; it represents the national spirit of Republic of China nationals.
The five petals of the flower - symbolises Five Races Under One Union; it also symbolises Five Cardinal Relationships (Wǔlún), Five Constants (Wǔcháng) and Five Ethics (Wǔjiào) according to Confucian philosophy (national philosophy of imperial China for two millennia until 1912, when the Qing Dynasty was overthrown and the Republic of China was established)
The branches (枝橫), shadow (影斜), flexibility (曳疏), and cold resistance (傲霜) of the plum blossom also represent the four kinds of noble virtues, "originating and penetrating, advantageous and firm" mentioned in the I Ching (Book of Changes).

Use of the symbol 
As one of the national symbols of the Republic of China, the plum blossom design has often been utilised on logos used by the ROC government. This includes the emblem of the Office of the President and the Chinese Taipei Olympic flag (also known as "Plum Blossom Banner"), which Taiwan uses in place of the Republic of China flag during international sports events, due to political reasons.

Furthermore, the plum blossom design is also part of:
 the rank insignia of Colonels in the Republic of China Armed Forces
 Obverse side of NT$0.5 coin
 Reverse side of NT$10 coin
 Watermark of New Taiwan dollar paper notes

See also

Flag of the Republic of China
National symbols of Taiwan
Prunus mei

References

Flowers in culture
National symbols of Taiwan